is a Japanese idol, singer, actor and radio host. He is a member of Japanese male idol group Kanjani Eight, which is under the management of Johnny & Associates. He is also the group's bassist and one of its main rappers. He was a morning show co-host on Kansai TV. His image color in the group is orange.

Discography

Concerts/tours 
X-mas Party [Christmas concerts] (2002–2005) at Osaka Shochiku-za
Osaka-jo Hall Zenyasai  1st live (Summer 2005)
F.T.O.N. (Funky Tokyo Osaka Nagoya) 1st tour (Summer 2006)
1st Nationwide tour (Fall/Autumn 2006)
2nd Nationwide tour (Winter 2006)
1st Solo Concert at Osaka Shochiku-za (12/18-12/20 2006)
What! Really!? Surprise!! Kanjani8 Dome Concert in Osaka (February 24–25, 2007) at Kyocera Dome Osaka

Activities

Weekly variety shows
Kanjani no Shiwake Eito 関ジャニの仕分け∞ (TV Asahi, 2011.04.06 -)
Ariehen Sekai ありえへん∞世界 (with Murakami Shingo and Yasuda Shota)(TV Tokyo, 2008.04.15 -)
Kanjani8 no Janiben 関ジャニ∞のジャニ勉 (Kansai TV, 2007.05.02 -)
-ended- Ai No Shura Bara 愛の修羅バラ!(Kansai TV, 2009.04.05 – 2010.12.26)
-ended- Can!Jani!(TV Asahi, 2008.10.04 – 2009.09.26)
-ended- Tsukkai Everyday 痛快！エブリデイ (Kansai TV, 2007.04 – 2008.06)
-ended- Muchaburi(TV Tokyo, 2007.04.03 – 2008.03.25)
-ended- Honjani (Kansai TV & Fuji TV, 2003.06.10 -2007.04)
-ended- Suka J (TV Tokyo, 2005.10.04 – 2007.03.27)
-ended- Mugendai no Gimon (TV Tokyo, 2005.04.05 – 2005.09.27)
-ended- Urajani (TV Tokyo, 2004.04.06 – 2005.03.29)
-ended- J³Kansai (Kansai TV, 2002.10.02 – 2003.03.26)

TV dramas

 Kikazaru Koi ni wa Riyuu ga Atte (着飾る恋には理由があって) (2021)
 Yonimo Kimyuna Monogatari  2013 Spring SP (世にも奇妙な物語 2013年 春の特別編-石油が出た) (2013)
 Nakuna、Harachan (泣くな、はらちゃん) (2013)
 Boys on the Run (ボーイズ・オン・ザ・ラン) (2012)
 13sai no Hello Work (13歳のハローワーク) (series finale only) (2012)
 O-PARTS (O-PARTS〜オーパーツ〜) (2012)
 Strawberry Night (ストロベリーナイト) (2012)
 Ikiteterudakedenankurunaisa (生きてるだけでなんくるないさ) (2011)
 Freeter Ie wo Kau (フリーター、家を買う。) (2010)
 Room 0 (0号室の客) (Second Story only) (2009)
 Uta no Onii-san (歌のおにいさん) (2009)
 Wachigaiya Itosato (輪違屋糸里) (2007)
 Jitensha Shonenki (自転車少年記) (2006)
 Double (複体) (2006)
 Meitantei Catherine Meitantei Catherine vs Totsukawa Keibu (名探偵キャサリンVS十津川警部) (2006)
 Kunitori Monogatari (国盗り物語) (2005)
 Shichinin no Samurai J ke no Hanran (七人のサムライ J家の反乱) (1999)

Film
Strawberry Night(movie) (ストロベリーナイト (映画)) (2013.01.26)
Eightranger (エイトレンジャー) (2012.07.28)
Wild 7 (ワイルド7) (2011.12.21)
Eight Ranger 2 (2014)
The Stand-In Thief (2017)

Stage
Kyo To Kyo (1998)
Another (2002)
Douton Boys (2003)
Summer Storm (2004)
Hey!Say!Dream Boy(2004)
Magical Summer (2005)
Dream Boys(2005)
Another's Another (2006)
Dream Boys (2006)
What's Eating Gilbert Grape (2011)
BOB (2012)
Macbeth (2016)

Radio
Kanjani8 Murakami Shingo & Maruyama Ryuhei no Recomen! 関ジャニ∞　村上信五と丸山隆平のレコメン！(Nippon Cultural Broadcasting, JOQR 1134, 2013.04.04 -)

External links
 Teichiku Official Site > Kanjani8
 Johnny's Entertainment Official Site > Kanjani8

1983 births
Living people
People from Kyoto
Japanese male pop singers
Japanese idols
Kanjani Eight members
Musicians from Kyoto Prefecture